Beni Douala is a town and commune in Tizi Ouzou Province in northern Algeria.
At Dwala, or Aït Douala  (At Dwala in Kabyle), is located 17 km south-east of Tizi-Ouzou.

Villages in the commune 
At its creation, in 1984, the commune of At Dwala was composed of the following eighteen localities. :

 Thala Bounane
 Ighil Bezrou
 Thighzert
 Aguemoun
 Thabarkoukth
 Thamaright
 (Ait Ɛli Waɛli) Aït Ali Ouali
 (Ath Bu Yehya) Ait Bouyahia
 Amsiouene (Amsiwen)
 (Ait Bu Ɛli) Aït Bouali
 Aït Hellal
 (Ait Yidir) Aït Idir
 Ait Mesbah
 Aït Douala
 (Ichardiwen Oufella) Icherdiouene Oufella
 Taguemount Oukerrouch
 (Tamaɣuct) Tamaghoucht (Tamaɣuct)
 Ighil Mimoun
 Taboudrist
 Thaddarth Oufella
 Tala Khelil
 Tchardioune Bedda

References

Communes of Tizi Ouzou Province